The ranat ek ("also xylophone") is a Thai musical instrument in the percussion family that consists of 21 wooden bars suspended by cords over a boat-shaped trough resonator and struck by two mallets. It is used as a leading instrument in the piphat ensemble.

Ranat ek bars are typically made from rosewood (Dalbergia oliveri; ; mai ching chan) and they are two types of ranat ek mallets. The hard mallets create the sharp and bright sound, normally used for faster playing. The soft mallets create the mellow and softer tone, used for slower songs.

In the Thai xylophone family, there are several similar instrument with bars made from different types of material, such as metal (ranat ek lek, ranat thum lek) and glass (ranat kaeo). There is another similar Thai xylophone that has a different kind of wooden bar, called “ranat thum”. Its appearance is similar to the ranat ek, but it is lower and wider. It is usually played in accompaniment of a ranat ek. Also, ranat ek is very similar to the Cambodian xylophone called “roneat ek”, and the Burmese bamboo xylophone called "pattala".

History
The earliest known description of ranat in Thailand was written in 19th century (1826 AD), an instrument probably of Burmese origin (pattala) and Khmer origin (Roneat Ek or Roneat Aek). Ranat ek was originally an instrument called Krap. A pair of krap was used to keep the rhythm in ensembles. Later, krap were put into a series. However, the tones when the bars were struck were out of tune. Then it was decided to make a series of krap on two tracks to support it. After the instrument makers gained some experience and knowledge, the krap were made in a series of sizes with a track to hold them together making the tone clearer. To make them into a series, a heavy string was threaded through holes made near the ends of the krap. The krap were placed near each other on this cord and the entire “keyboard” was hung on a supporting stand. Later on, the keyboard was improved using krap and beeswax with lead shavings attached underneath each krap to improve the tone. This whole instrument was called “ranat” and the krap which make up the keyboard are called “luk ranat”. The whole series of krap or the keyboard is called “pern”. At first the keys of ranat were made of two kinds of bamboo, Dendrocalamus Nees (Dendrocalamus Nees; Thai: ไผ่ตง; phai tong), and Indian Timber Bamboo (Bambusa tulda; Thai: ไผ่บง; phai bong). Later on, different types of hardwood were used, such as rosewood (Dalbergia oliveri; ; mai ching chan), Lakoochaand (Artocarpus lacucha; Thai: ไม้มะหาด; mai mahat) or Siamese Rosewood (Dalbergia cochinchinensis; Thai: ไม้พะยูง; mai pa yung). Normally Indian timber bamboo is preferred because of its tone. The support of the keyboard is shaped like a Thai riverboat, curving at each end.

The first Thai instrument ensembles only used one ranat, and this had fewer keys than the ranat nowadays. More and more keys were added until the ranat became too large for one stand to hold. So a second ranat with lower toned keys was created. This was called ranat thum, with the original ranat with the higher-toned keys being called ranat ek.

Structure
The modern ranat ek model has 22 keys. The lowest-toned key is 38 cm long, 5 cm wide and 1.5 cm thick. The keys decrease in size and become thicker as the tones go higher. The highest-toned key is 30 cm long.

Tuning

Each octave is divided into seven equal parts, which results in complex musical ratios but easy transposition between keys (analogous to the benefits and drawbacks of Western 12-pitch equal temperament).

References

External links
Sound sample
 ranat ek page

See also
 Ranat
 Ranat thum
 Ranat ek lek
 Ranat thum lek
 Traditional Thai musical instruments
 2004 Thai Movie, "The Overture" about ranat-ek player Luang Pradit Phairoh

Thai musical instruments
Keyboard percussion instruments